, is a Japanese vocalist who is well known for his work in the soundtracks for anime and tokusatsu productions, most notably Taiyou Sentai Sun Vulcan, Kinnikuman, and Space Sheriff Gavan.

Discography
Only opening and ending themes are included on this list.

Anime television

"KA・BU・TO" (Karasu Tengu Kabuto OP/1990)

OVA

"Gods" (New Getter Robo ED/2004)

Tokusatsu
Taiyou Sentai Sun Vulcan (1981)

Space Sheriff Gavan (1982)

Space Sheriff Sharivan (1983)

Space Sheriff Shaider (1984)

Birth of the 10th! Kamen Riders All Together!! (1984)

"FORGET MEMORIES" (ED)
MegaBeast Investigator Juspion (1985)
"Chou Wakusei Sentou Hokan Daileon"
Sekai Ninja Sen Jiraiya (1988)

"SHI-NO-BI '88" (ED)
The Mobile Cop Jiban (1989)

Hyakujuu Sentai Gaoranger (2001)

Ninpu Sentai Hurricaneger (2002)
WIND & THUNDER
Bakuryū Sentai Abaranger (2003)

"ABARE-SPIRIT FOREVER"
"Emotion is MAX!" (Kibun ha MAX!)
Shin Kenjūshi France Five (2004)

Mahou Sentai Magiranger (2005)
Song For Magitopia (with Ichiro Mizuki & Hironobu Kageyama)
Go! Go! Speed Phantom

Lion-Maru G (2006)

GoGo Sentai Boukenger (2006)

GoGo Sentai Boukenger vs. Super Sentai (2007)
 with Takayuki Miyauchi & MoJo
Juken Sentai Gekiranger (2007)

Engine Sentai Go-onger (2008)
"G12! Checker flag" (G12! チェッカーフラッグ, G12! Chekkāfuraggu)
Samurai Sentai Shinkenger (2009)

Kamen Rider OOO (2010)
O Scanner, Medagabryu (Kamen Rider OOO's transformation device and weapon, voiced by Kushida in the series)
"Climax Heroes OOO" (theme song for the tie-in PSP/Wii game)
"POWER to TEARER" (With Shu Watanabe. Kamen Rider OOO Putotyra Combo's ending theme.)
Tensou Sentai Goseiger (2010)

Gokaiger vs. Gavan (2012)
"JUMP" (With Tsuyoshi Matsubara. Ending of Gokaiger vs Gavan The Movie)
Space Sheriff Gavan: The Movie (2012)

Zyuden Sentai Kyoryuger (2013)
 (with Mayumi Gojo)
Ressha Sentai ToQger (2014)
Ressha Sentai ToQger Safari (with Mitsuko Horie)

Films

Video Games
"TIME DIVER" (Super Robot Wars Alpha insert theme/2000)

Advertisement songs
Fuji Safari Park
Microman
Ogawa Coffee

External links

Official website

Japanese male singers
Living people
People from Yokohama
Kinnikuman
Musicians from Kanagawa Prefecture
Anime musicians
Year of birth missing (living people)